Funeral party may refer to:

 Some of the participants at a funeral
 Funeral Party, a four-piece American band 
 The Funeral Party (film), a 2007 Russian film
 "The Funeral Party", a song by The Cure from the 1981 album, Faith
 Funeral Party, a book series published 1995 and 1997 by Shade Rupe